Edson Daniel Castillo García (born 18 May 1994) is a Venezuelan footballer who plays as a midfielder for Caracas.

Career

Club
Edson Castillo began his career at Mineros, made his debut in the Venezuelan Primera División at the age of 16, against Aragua on 17 October 2010.

In June 2016, Castillo moved to Azerbaijan Premier League side Neftchi Baku.

In July 2017, Neftchi Baku announced that Castillo had moved back to Mineros on loan until the end of 2017. On 18 December 2017, Neftchi Baku announced that they had parted ways with Castillo by mutual consent.

International
Castillo played with U-17 at Sudamericana sub-17 in Ecuador and with U-20 at Sudamericana sub-20 in Argentina.

He made his debut for Venezuela national football team on 13 June 2021, in the 2021 Copa América opening game against Brazil. He substituted Cristian Cásseres Jr. in the 83rd minute as Venezuela lost 0–3.

Career statistics

Club

International goals

|-
| 1. || 20 June 2021 || Estádio Olímpico Nilton Santos, Rio de Janeiro, Brazil ||  ||  ||  || 2021 Copa América
|-
|}

Honours
 Mineros
Copa Venezuela (2): 2011, 2017

References

External links

 Profile on official club website

1994 births
Living people
Association football midfielders
Venezuelan footballers
Venezuela youth international footballers
Venezuela under-20 international footballers
Venezuela international footballers
Venezuelan expatriate footballers
A.C.C.D. Mineros de Guayana players
Neftçi PFK players
Monagas S.C. players
Academia Puerto Cabello players
Club Atlético Zacatepec players
Venezuelan Primera División players
Azerbaijan Premier League players
Ascenso MX players
Expatriate footballers in Azerbaijan
Expatriate footballers in Mexico
Venezuelan expatriate sportspeople in Azerbaijan
Venezuelan expatriate sportspeople in Mexico
2021 Copa América players
People from Ciudad Guayana